Puermytrans is a monotypic moth genus of the family Hepialidae. The only described species is P. chiliensis of Chile.

References

External links
Hepialidae genera

Hepialidae
Monotypic moth genera
Taxa named by Pierre Viette
Exoporia genera
Moths of South America
Endemic fauna of Chile